Actinoptera rosetta is a species of tephritid or fruit flies in the genus Actinoptera of the family Tephritidae.

Distribution
Mozambique, South Africa.

References

Tephritinae
Insects described in 1934
Diptera of Africa